Denise Miller (born July 17, 1963) is an American actress. She is noted for her appearances in the television sitcoms Archie Bunker's Place and Fish, as well as the made-for-television movie Sooner or Later.

Miller started her acting career at age 11, taking lessons with Sylvia Leigh, that led to jobs with Sears Roebuck and a portrayal of Helen Keller in an Exxon Bicentennial advertisement. Miller can also be seen in episodes of Charles in Charge and Barney Miller. She played Tina Manucci on the 1970s sitcom Makin' It.

Filmography

References

External links

Sooner or Later: 30th Anniversary Blog Post

1963 births
Living people
20th-century American actresses
21st-century American actresses
Actresses from New York City
American film actresses
American television actresses
People from Brooklyn
21st-century American women